USS Calabash (SP-108) was a civilian motor yacht that served in the 7th Naval District as an armed patrol boat in the United States Navy during July and August 1917. Apparently found unsuitable for naval service, Calabash served for less than a month before being decommissioned and returned to her owner in August 1917.
 
Calabash was built in 1912 by Mathis Shipbuilding Company at Camden, New Jersey for William John Matheson of New York and Coconut Grove, Florida. The vessel was of a type described as "houseboat" built by Mathis and others and was Mathis hull number 24, assigned official number 210659 and signal letters LCQG on registration. The vessel's registration shows , length , breadth , depth  and home port of Miami.

Calabash was based at the Matheson estate where he experimented with planting, particularly coconuts, and built "Mashta House" where Matheson, as Commodore of the Biscayne Bay Yacht Club frequently entertained guests gathering by boat. The original house is now gone, but the harbor that was home port for Calabash and temporary port for other Matheson vessels when in Florida remains. The Chowder Party was an annual event hosted by Matheson that attracted a fleet of visiting boats.

The U.S. Navy acquired Calabash on 25 July 1917 for use as a section patrol vessel during World War I. She was commissioned the same day as USS Calabash (SP-108). By August 1917 three of Matheson's yachts were in government service: Marpessa, Calabash, and Coco.

Footnotes

References

External links
Calabash and other Mathis houseboats, December 1919 Motor Boating advertisement. (Note interior photo of dining room of Leonie)
Calabash – University of Miami. Library. Special Collections
 Calabash in Biscayne Bay – University of Miami. Library. Special Collections
NavSource Online: Section Patrol Craft Photo Archive: Calabash (SP 108)

Patrol vessels of the United States Navy
World War I patrol vessels of the United States
Ships built by John H. Mathis & Company
1912 ships